Syed Abdul Sayeed is an Indian philosopher and professor of philosophy at The English and Foreign Languages University. He previously taught in Aligarh Muslim University for eighteen years. 
Sayeed received his PhD in 1985 from IIT Kanpur.

Books
 Knowledge and Reality, Syed Abdul Sayeed, Academic Foundation, 1990,

References

External links
"Two Conceptions of Reality : Tagore and Einstein" in Tagore, Einstein and the Nature of Reality ed Partha Ghosh 2019 https://books.google.co.in/books?id=mwWQDwAAQBAJ&pg=PT3&lpg=PT3&dq=Partha+Ghosh+tagore+and+Einstein+2019&source=bl&ots=OK4aDQRqs5&sig=ACfU3U2WOoxid64_LEs7m-YkyH2axYrPNw&hl=en&sa=X&ved=2ahUKEwjB95_F3OnmAhU6yDgGHasyBAcQ6AEwBHoECAoQAQ#v=onepage&q=Partha%20Ghosh%20tagore%20and%20Einstein%202019&f=false
 Syed Abdul Sayeed at EFL University
 
 
 

Hermeneutists
Phenomenologists
Continental philosophers
20th-century Indian philosophers
21st-century Indian philosophers
Existentialists
Philosophy academics
IIT Kanpur alumni
Academic staff of the English and Foreign Languages University
Academic staff of Aligarh Muslim University
Sri Venkateswara University alumni
Year of birth missing (living people)
Living people